Euthria somalica is a species of sea snail, a marine gastropod mollusk in the family Buccinidae, the true whelks.

Description
The size of the shell attains 71 mm. The Euthria somalica ranges in shades of brown, inside a swirled shell.

Distribution
This marine species occurs off Somalia.

References

Endemic fauna of Somalia
Buccinidae
Gastropods described in 1999